Heath High Level railway station is one of two railway stations serving Heath, Cardiff, Wales. The station is located on the Rhymney Line. Passenger services are provided by Transport for Wales as part of the Valley Lines network.

It was opened by the Rhymney Railway in 1915. The Low Level station is located on the Coryton Line.

Services
This drops to half-hourly in the evenings and to two-hourly on Sundays (when southbound trains run to ).

See also
 Heath Low Level railway station
 List of railway stations in Cardiff

Notes

External links

Railway stations in Cardiff
DfT Category F2 stations
Former Rhymney Railway stations
Railway stations in Great Britain opened in 1915
Railway stations served by Transport for Wales Rail